Yuen Long New Town is a new town in the northwest New Territories, Hong Kong. It was developed from the traditional market town of Yuen Long Town from the late 1970s onwards.

As it is located in the centre of Yuen Long Plain, the town occupies the best location for villages in the surrounding area to sell their crops and fish. To the west is Ping Shan, south Shap Pat Heung, east Kam Tin, and north Nam Sang Wai.

History
Yuen Long Town was a traditional market town in the area also known as Yuen Long San Hui today, within the Yuen Long District in the New Territories. The market town and the adjacent Long Ping Estate, Yuen Long Industrial Estate, Tong Tau Industrial Area, YOHO Town, etc. developed into the Yuen Long New Town in the 1970s and early 1980s. 
The Hong Kong Government first put Yuen Long New Town on the list of new towns in 1972 and planned several large-scale housing estates. The first development started in 1974. In 1978, Yuen Long New Town was put on the list of second generation new towns. It served as a secondary administrative centre.

Although the new town started in the 1970s, it was developed much more slowly compared to the other new towns due to its long distance from urban Kowloon. Commuters needed to travel via other areas like Tuen Mun or Shek Kong with no rail transport. With the rapid development of an adjacent new town, Tin Shui Wai New Town, in the 1980s, the road network was drastically improved by the late 1990s. It was not until late 2003 that the West Rail line was completed. These improvements spurred new waves of town development in the 2000s.

Public housing 

Under government plans, the western new town is mainly residential. There are three public housing estates (including one Interim Housing) in the area.

Industry
Industry is concentrated on the North side of Yuen Long New Town, namely Yuen Long Industrial Estate and Tung Tau Industrial Area. These areas are managed by the Hong Kong Science and Technology Park. Only new and improved companies can operate in the area.

Recreation
Yuen Long Park is located southwest of the town with pagoda, accompanied with Yuen Long Stadium, Yuen Long Theatre and Yuen Long Swimming Pool. This area is a less bustling region within the town.

Transport
Before Tai Lam Tunnel was opened, the Castle Peak Road and Tuen Mun Road forms the arteries of traffic with urban Kowloon. If the two roads are closed due to accidents or any other reason, it would affect the traffic of Yuen Long. The Tai Lam Tunnel, Tuen Ma line and the Light Rail Transit (LRT) provide alternative routes to residents of Yuen Long. Some bus routes connected urban area and Yuen Long New Town together by New Territories East highway networks before Tai Lam Tunnel opened.

There are two Tuen Ma line stations in the new town, Long Ping and Yuen Long, located near Long Ping Estate and eastern end of the town respectively. Light Rail route travels along the main road (Castle Peak Road, commonly known as "Yuen Long Main Road" by locals) located at the centre of the town. Yuen Long station is the interchange station of Tuen Ma line and Light Rail.

See also
Yuen Long Town

References

External links
Website of the new town (from Civil Engineering and Development Department)
Info from WWF HK

Yuen Long District
New towns in Hong Kong
New towns started in the 1970s